Zodiak Broadcasting Station is a privately owned radio station in Malawi. It was founded in 2005 by Gospel Kazako. The station has more than 25 transmitting sites and reaches the whole of Malawi. Nearly 75% of its programmes are broadcast in Chichewa, Malawi's main language. One of its most popular shows is its Chichewa talk show 'Tiuzeni Zoona'.

Election coverage
It became the official broadcaster of Presidential and Parliamentary elections in the 2009 elections due to its neutral coverage.

Online
Zodiak offers live radio screening and an online website that is accessible worldwide.

Accolades
It has been the recipient of many MISA awards.

References

Radio stations in Malawi